Kurt Röthlisberger (born 21 May 1951 in Suhr) is a retired football referee from Switzerland. He is known for supervising five matches in the FIFA World Cup: three matches in 1990, and two in 1994.

Career
In the 1994 World Cup, he refereed the round of 16 match between Germany and Belgium, which Germany won 3–2. Röthlisberger later admitted that he missed a penalty when Thomas Helmer tripped Josip Weber in the penalty area against Germany and due to this mistake he did not referee another game in the tournament.

He also refereed the 1992-93 UEFA Champions League final between Olympique de Marseille and A.C. Milan.

In 2011, former Turkish referee and sports commentator Ahmet Çakar claimed that Manchester United's 1993-94 UEFA Champions League tie with Galatasaray was fixed. Çakar claimed that Galatasaray bribed referee Röthlisberger to fix the 0-0 draw, which put the Turks through at United’s expense. Röthlisberger sent off Eric Cantona at the end of the match and the United star claimed at the time the official had been bribed. At the time, Cantona told L’Equipe: “I am certain referees have been bought in the European Cup and I ask myself whether Mr Rothlisberger had not also been bought.”

He was later banned from refereeing for life after allegations of match fixing in the 1996-97 UEFA Champions League. The game in question was between Grasshoppers Club Zürich and AJ Auxerre, with Vadim Zhuk of Belarus the referee. UEFA said Röthlisberger contacted the Swiss team and asked if it would be interested in having the referee favor the Grasshoppers.

References

External links 
Profile

1951 births
Living people
Swiss football referees
UEFA Champions League referees
FIFA World Cup referees
1990 FIFA World Cup referees
1994 FIFA World Cup referees
UEFA Euro 1992 referees